The Asian murex (Chicoreus asianus) is a species of sea snail, a marine gastropod mollusk in the family Muricidae, the murex snails or rock snails.

Description
 Size 6–15 cm

Distribution
 SE Japan - China - Vietnam

References

Chicoreus
Gastropods described in 1942